Eudonia siderina is a moth of the family Crambidae. It is endemic to the Hawaiian islands of Kauai and Maui.

The larvae feed on moss.

External links

Eudonia
Endemic moths of Hawaii
Moths described in 1899